John Tyson may refer to:
 John J. Tyson (born 1947), professor in biological sciences at Virginia Tech
 John Baird Tyson (1928–2014), educator and explorer in the Himalayas
 John W. Tyson (died 1967), American businessman, founder of Tyson Foods
 John H. Tyson (born 1953), chairman and heir to Tyson Foods
 John M. Tyson (born 1953), North Carolina Court of Appeals Judge
 John R. Tyson (1856–1923), United States Representative from Alabama
 John Tyson Wigan (1872–1952), British politician and army officer
 John C. Tyson (librarian) (1951–1995), African-American State Librarian of Virginia
 John C. Tyson (judge) (1926–2012), American jurist
 John A. Tyson (1873–1971), judge of the United States Tax Court